XHMO-FM is a radio station on 93.9 FM in Morelia, Michoacán. It is owned by Grupo ACIR and carries its Match pop format.

History

XHMO received its concession on August 29, 1970. It was owned by Radio FM de Morelia, S.A. and has been operated by ACIR for most of its history.

Match
On December 26, 2019, Disney and ACIR announced they were mutually ending their relationship, which had covered twelve Mexican cities. Ten of the twelve Radio Disney stations, including XHMO, were transitioned to ACIR's replacement pop format, Match.

References

Grupo ACIR
Radio stations in Michoacán